Bherulal Patidar  (1941-2005) was a leader of Bharatiya Janata Party from Madhya Pradesh. He was the deputy speaker of Madhya Pradesh Legislative Assembly from 1993 to 1998. He was a member of the assembly elected four times from the Mhow constituency. Patidar served as a minister in Government of Madhya Pradesh from 1990 to 1992.

References

1941 births
2005 deaths
Deputy Speakers of the Madhya Pradesh Legislative Assembly
Madhya Pradesh MLAs 1993–1998
People from Indore district
Bharatiya Janata Party politicians from Madhya Pradesh